Mind the gap is a common safety announcement on the London Underground railway system and other train and subway systems, warning of the visual gap between the train doorway and the station platform.
Mind the gap may also refer to:

Arts, entertainment, and media

Films
 Mind the Gap (2004 film), a 2004 film written & directed by Eric Schaeffer
 Mind the Gap (2007 film), a 2007 Swedish film
 Minding the Gap, a 2018 American documentary film directed by Bing Liu

Literature
 Mind the Gap (novel), a 2008 fantasy novel written by Christopher Golden and Tim Lebbon
 Mind the Gap, a book by Michael Rosen

Music
 Mind the Gap (Tristan Psionic album), 2000
 Mind the Gap (Scooter album), 2004
 Mind the Gap (Maria Pia De Vito album), 2009
 Mind the Gap (Nabiha album), 2013
 Mind The Gap, a 1995 album by the Irish band Kíla
 "Mind the Gap" (song), a 2012 song by Danish singer Nabiha
 "Mind The Gap", a 1987 song by The Justified Ancients of Mu Mu from the album 1987 (What the Fuck Is Going On?)

Other uses in arts, entertainment, and media
 Mind the Gap, a British television game show hosted by Paul Ross
 Mind the Gap, a comic published by Image Comics
Bridget Christie Minds the Gap, a BBC Radio 4 comedy programme
 Mind the Gap Films, an independent TV production company based in Ireland
 Mind the Gap Theatre, a theatre company in New York and London
 Mind the Gap Theatre company, England's largest disability theatre company, based in Bradford, West Yorkshire
 "Mind the Gap", an episode of SpongeBob SquarePants

See also
 Gap (disambiguation)
 Mind the Gaps, a state-level legislative campaign in Connecticut